This is a list of Polish television related events from 2002.

Events
6 April - Jarek Jakimowicz is voted winner of Big Brother VIP.
25 May - Pensjonat pod Różą actress Magdalena Walach and her partner Cezary Olszewski win the seventh series of Taniec z Gwiazdami.
1 June - Janusz Strączek wins the sixth and final series of Big Brother.
29 November - Male acrobatics duo Melkart Ball win the first series of Mam talent!.
30 November - Klan actress Agata Kulesza and her partner Stefano Terrazzino win the eighth series of Taniec z Gwiazdami.
5 December - Martyna Melosik wins the first series of Fabryka Gwiazd.

Debuts
13 September - Mam talent! (2008–present)

Television shows

1990s
Klan (1997–present)

2000s
M jak miłość (2000–present)
Na Wspólnej (2003–present)
Pierwsza miłość (2004–present)
Dzień Dobry TVN (2005–present)
Taniec z gwiazdami (2005-2011, 2014–present)

Ending this year
Big Brother (2001-2002, 2007-2008)

Births

Deaths

See also
2008 in Poland